is a Paralympian athlete from Japan competing mainly in category T53 sprint events.

Susumu competed in the 100m, 200m, 400m and 800m in the 2004 Summer Paralympics but it was as part of the Japanese 4 × 400 m relay team that he won a bronze medal.  Then in the 2008 Summer Paralympics in Beijing he again competed in the 400m, 800m and 4 × 400 m relay but this time failed to win a medal.

References

Paralympic athletes of Japan
Athletes (track and field) at the 2004 Summer Paralympics
Athletes (track and field) at the 2008 Summer Paralympics
Paralympic bronze medalists for Japan
Living people
Medalists at the 2004 Summer Paralympics
Year of birth missing (living people)
Paralympic medalists in athletics (track and field)
21st-century Japanese people